{{DISPLAYTITLE:C17H19ClN2S}}
The molecular formula C17H19ClN2S (molar mass: 318.86 g/mol) may refer to:

 Chlorpromazine, the oldest typical antipsychotic
 Thioflavin, two dyes used for histology staining

Molecular formulas